Mangelia paessleri is a species of sea snail, a marine gastropod mollusk in the family Mangeliidae.

Description
The length of the shell attains 3.8 mm.

Distribution
This marine species occurs off Tierra del Fuego.

It is also found as a fossil in Quaternary strata in Chile; age range: 2.588 to 0.781 Ma

References

  Strebel, Beiträge zur Kenntnis der Molluskenfauna der  Magalhaen-Provinz; Jena,Gustav Fischer,1904–1907
 Forcelli, D.O. (2000) Moluscos Magallanicos Guia de Moluscos de Patagonia y Sur de Chile. Vazquez Mazzini Editores, Santiago. 200 pp.
 S. N. Nielson and C. Valdovinos. 2008. Early Pleistocene mollusks of the Tubul Formation, south-central Chile. The Nautilus 122(4):201–216

External links
  Tucker, J.K. 2004 Catalog of recent and fossil turrids (Mollusca: Gastropoda). Zootaxa 682:1–1295.
 

paessleri
Gastropods described in 1905
Endemic fauna of Chile